Lotus glinoides is a dwarf annual with retuse leaflets and pinkish purple flowers. It can be found in the Canary Islands, Cape Verde and from North Africa to Pakistan.

References 

Plants described in 1837
glinoides
Flora of the Canary Islands